Transmembrane protein 89 (TMEM89) is a protein which in humans is encoded by the TMEM89 gene.

Gene

Structure 
The TMEM89 gene is found on the minus strand of chromosome 3 (3p21.31) from 48,658,192 to 48,659,288 and is 1,011 nucleotides long. The gene has two exons. These two exons are not predicted to be alternatively spliced.

Gene expression 
The TMEM89 gene is most highly expressed in the testis. TMEM89 is also found to be expressed at low levels in other tissues such as the stomach, kidneys, heart, ovaries, thyroid, colon, bone marrow, and in adrenal tissues. This gene is also expressed in fetal heart, stomach, kidney, and intestine tissues. Immunohistochemistry data has also found TMEM89 located in the cell membranes of colon, fallopian tube, kidney, and testis tissues. Expression of the TMEM89 gene has also been found in low amounts in the brain tissue from a mouse cerebellum.

Gene expression neighborhood 
Human TMEM89 is a part of the Human Protein Atlas expression cluster 23: SpermatidS - Flagellum & Golgi organization. The 15 closest expression neighbors include OR4M1, ANTXRL, TGIF2LX, CPXCR1, C3orf84, CXorf66, CLDN17, C11orf94, USP50, SPDYE4, MMP20, SSMEM1, C17orf98, SPACA1, and LYZL1.

Differential gene expression 
TMEM89 expression is much higher in amniotic fluid derived hAKPC-P cells compared with immortalized hIPod line cells. TMEM89 expression is higher in cells that have macrophage migration inhibitory factor (MIF) knocked down compared to the control. TMEM89 expression is the lowest in cardiomyocytes from human embryonic stem cells, compared to expression in human embryonic stem cells, embryoid bodies with beating cardiomyocytes, and cardiomyocytes from fetal hearts.

Clinical significance 
Gene expression of TMEM89 was found to be upregulated in upper tract urothelial carcinomas, and therefore predicted as a possible biomarker secretory protein for these types of carcinomas. The TMEM89 gene was found to be a potential modifier of autism spectrum disorder severity in a SNP analysis. Gene expression of TMEM89 was also used in a model that predicted the risk score for a potential relapse in stage 1 testicular germ cell tumors.

Protein

Structure

Primary 
The human TMEM89 protein is 159 amino acids long. This protein has a molecular mass of ~17.5kDa and an isoelectric point of ~10 pI. Proteins with a more basic pI are usually associated with the mitochondria or the plasma membrane and have fewer protein interactions. The protein structure contains two topological domains (extracellular and cytoplasmic) and a helical transmembrane domain. The human TMEM89 protein is rich in the amino acids histidine, leucine, and tryptophan. The amino acids aspartate, asparagine, and phenylalanine are present in low amounts in the human TMEM89 protein. Amino acid patterns such as ED are present in the human TMEM89 protein at low amounts, while the pattern KR-ED is present in high amounts. Within the extracellular domain of the human TMEM89 protein, there are 3 cysteines with regular spacing. In the cytoplasmic domain, there are two positive amino acid runs from amino acids 3-5 and 25-27. These different amino acid patterns and protein domains can be visualized in the figures to the right.

Secondary 
The TMEM89 protein is only made up of α-helices and strands. The α-helices are distributed all throughout the protein in all three domains.

Tertiary 
The tertiary structure of Human TMEM89 was predicted using Alphafold and I-Tasser software. These structures can be seen on the right.

Post-translational modifications 
The TMEM89 protein has a predicted N-myristylation site from amino acids 47-52, a predicted Src homology 3 (SH3) binding domain from amino acids 106-111, and one conserved predicted phosphorylation site at amino acid S117. N-myristylation is a protein lipid modification that has roles in protein-protein interactions, cell signaling, and targeting proteins to endomembranes and the plasma membrane.  Proteins with SH3 binding domains are usually involved in signal transduction pathways, cytoskeleton organization, membrane trafficking, or organelle assembly. Protein phosphorylation is an important process involved with signal transduction, protein synthesis, cell division, cell growth, development, and aging.

Interactions 
The human TMEM89 protein interacts with the proteins C4A, RBM15B, GOLGA6A, PFKFB4, DOCK3, MAPKAPK3, ZNF557, and ZBTB47.

Homologs

Orthologs 
Orthologs of TMEM89 are only found in mammals. The only mammalian taxon that does not contain a TMEM89 ortholog is the monotremes.

Below is a table with information on some of the orthologs of human TMEM89. These orthologs were used to make the multiple sequence alignment and N-myristylation site alignment to the right.

Conserved regions 
Regions within the cytoplasmic and extracellular domains of the human TMEM89 protein seem to be the most conserved, as seen in figures on the right. Some of these conserved amino acids are part of α-helices in the cytoplasmic and extracellular regions.

References 

Genes on human chromosome 3